Plešce is a village in Gorski kotar, Croatia.

References

Populated places in Primorje-Gorski Kotar County